Brentwood Academy is a coeducational Christian independent college preparatory school located in Brentwood, Tennessee, for grades 6–12.

History

The charter of Brentwood Academy was signed on November 20, 1969, after ten acres of land on Granny White Pike was gifted by Tom P. Kennedy, Jr.

Brentwood Academy was among a wave of private schools formed in response the court ordered desegregation of public schools. Brentwood Academy's leaders claimed the school was established to provide a sound, Christian education in a safer environment, but the sociologist Jennifer Dyer has argued that the school's stated objectives were simply a "guise" for the school's actual objective of allowing white parents to avoid enrolling their children in racially integrated public schools. Despite the school's claim that it was not founded for the purpose of racial segregation, it did not enroll any Black students until 1974, and did not have a Black graduate until 1980.

Applications to Brentwood Academy increased in 1980 after court rulings expanded desegregation busing in Nashville. At the time, only four of Brentwood Academy's 360 students were black.

In 2001, Brentwood Academy was a party in the United States Supreme Court case Brentwood Academy v. Tennessee Secondary School Athletic Association. The academy had sued the Tennessee Secondary School Athletic Association after the school was penalized for "undue influence" in recruiting football players, and the case was appealed to the Supreme Court. The court in this case held that a statewide association, incorporated to regulate interscholastic athletic competition among public and private schools, is regarded as engaging in state action when it enforces a rule against a member school.

In 2016, after the election of Donald Trump, a group of students held a rally in which they antagonized students of color with racist chants within the halls of the school. The schools response was that "God is in control" of politics. In 2021, a group of alumni known as the Brentwood Academy Anti-Racism Community complained to the board of trustees about insensitivity displayed to minorities, specifying among other things issues that occurred after the murders of Michael Brown and George Floyd, but noted months later that no action was taken by the school administration.

In 2017, Brentwood Academy was accused of telling their staff not to report child abuse, including the rape of a 12-year-old child.

Notable alumni

Football

Tremayne Allen, football player
 Kent Austin, Canadian Football League (CFL) player and coach
 Derek Barnett, NFL defensive end for the Philadelphia Eagles
 Kody Bliss, football player
Ryan Carrethers, football player
 King Dunlap, former professional football player for the San Diego Chargers
Jeff Hall, football player
Camron Johnson, football player
 Dawson Knox, tight end for Ole Miss and the Buffalo Bills.
 Mike MacIntyre, football coach
Jason Mathews, football player
Bubba Miller, football player
 Jalen Ramsey, professional football player for the Los Angeles Rams
C. J. Sanders, football player
Barry Turner, football player
 John Vaughn, football player
 Scott Wells, retired professional football player

Other athletes

 Andrew Bumbalough, athlete
Kennedy Chandler, basketball player
Shannon Doepking, softball player and coach
Victoria Dunlap, basketball player
 David Harrison, basketball player
 Darius Garland, basketball player for the Cleveland Cavaliers of the NBA
Bryce Jarvis, baseball player*Nicholas Nevid, swimmer* Jacob Stallings, MLB catcher for the Pittsburgh Pirates
 Brandan Wright, former NBA player for the Memphis Grizzlies

Musicians

 Ashlyne Huff, singer-songwriter and dancer
 Dann Huff, musician
 Gordon Kennedy, musician
 Holly Williams, recording artist

Other

DeAndre Kpana-Quamoh, accidental shooting victim

Notable faculty
Rhonda Blades, basketball player and coach
John Pierce, basketball player and coach
 Hubie Smith, Tennessee High School Hall of Fame basketball coach, only coach to win state championships with both boys and girls.
James Wilhoit, football player, coach

References

External links
 Brentwood Academy homepage

1969 establishments in Tennessee
Educational institutions established in 1969
Preparatory schools in Tennessee
Private high schools in Tennessee
Private middle schools in Tennessee
Segregation academies in Tennessee
Schools in Williamson County, Tennessee